It's Time for Love is an album by the R&B crooner Teddy Pendergrass. It did quite well, peaking at #19 on the Billboard albums chart and #6 on the R&B album charts. It also spawned three singles: "I Can't Live Without Your Love" (1981, peaked at #10 R&B), "You're My Latest, My Greatest Inspiration" (1982, #43 US, #4 R&B) and "Nine Times Out of Ten/The Gift of Love" (1982, #31 R&B). This was the last album released by Pendergrass before being paralyzed in a car accident the following year.

Track listing
All tracks composed by Kenny Gamble and Leon Huff, except where indicated.

 "I Can't Live Without Your Love" (Huff, Cecil Womack) 3:01
 "You're My Latest, My Greatest Inspiration" 5:23
 "Nine Times Out of Ten" 4:13
 "Keep On Lovin' Me" (Ken Williams) 4:38
 "It's Time for Love" 5:58
 "She's Over Me" (Barry Mann, Cynthia Weil) 3:52
 "I Can't Leave Your Love Alone" 4:43
 "You Must Live On" 3:49

Charts

Singles

References

External links
 It's Time for Love at Discogs

Teddy Pendergrass albums
1981 albums
Albums produced by Kenneth Gamble
Albums produced by Leon Huff
Albums recorded at Sigma Sound Studios
Philadelphia International Records albums